The Kota Tinggi Second Bridge is a bridge in Kota Tinggi District, Johor, Malaysia. It passes over the Johor River and located at Kota Tinggi Bypass (Federal Route 3). The bridge was opened on 1999 along with the opening of the Kota Tinggi Bypass.

See also
 Transport in Malaysia

1999 establishments in Malaysia
Bridges in Johor
Kota Tinggi District